Bonabes IV de Rougé de Derval (c. 1328 – 1377) was a knight from the House of Rougé, Lord of Rougé and Derval, Viscount of La Guerche, Governor of South Brittany and of Redon, General of the Breton army and later of the French King's army, and ambassador of the King of France in England.

Born about 1328, he inherited the vast lands of his ancestors and began very early to fight in the war of succession to the Duchy of Brittany. His father, his uncle and his grandfather had been killed by English knights at La Roche-Derrien in 1347. He later became the hostage of King Edward III of England for the person of the French King Jean, and escaped from the Tower of London. He died in 1377.

1328 births
1377 deaths
French generals
Rouge de Derval
Viscounts of La Guerche
14th-century French people